Emilia Nilsson Garip (born 21 April 2003) is a Swedish diver. She competed in the women's 1 metre springboard event at the 2019 World Aquatics Championships. She finished in 14th place in the preliminary round. In the women's 3 metre springboard event she finished in 47th place in the preliminary round. In 2021, Nilsson won two gold medals at the Swedish National Championships. In 2021, she finished in fifth place at the European Championships, and she also won two gold medals at the Junior European Swimming Championships.

Emilia's older sister, Jasmine Nilsson Garip (born 2000), has also competed in diving for the same club: Malmö KK. Jasmine finished 10th in the A-Girls 1m springboard event at the 2016 Swedish Youth Championships.

References

External links
 Emilia Nilsson Garip at FINA
 Emilia Nilsson Garip at Dive Recorder

2003 births
Living people
Swedish female divers
Place of birth missing (living people)
Sportspeople from Malmö
21st-century Swedish women